Sofia Assefa (Amharic: ሶፍአ አሠፋ; born 14 November 1987 in Tenta, South Wollo) is an Ethiopian long-distance runner who specializes in the 3000 metres steeplechase.  She was the silver medalist at the 2012 Summer Olympics.

Career 
She also competed at the 2008 Olympic Games without reaching the final.  She finished thirteenth at the 2009 World Championships and fourth at the 2009 World Athletics Final.

She won the silver medal in the 3000 metre steeplechase at the 2012 Summer Olympics, with a time of 9:09.84 minutes.  Her 3000-metre steeplechase personal best was also set in 2012, a time of 9:09.00 set in June 2012 in Oslo.

In 2013, she won the bronze medal at the World Championships in Moscow; and in 2015 she won the gold medal at the African Games in Brazzaville.

Her 5000-metre personal best is 15:59.74 minutes in the 5000 metres, achieved in July 2007 in Liège.

Early career 
Assefa's athletics career began in 2003, when she competed in the Adjibar high school competition in Tenta, her home district, in the region of South Wollo.  She was selected to represent her region.  In the regional competition, she ran the 5000 m, instead of the sprints that she had competed in previously.  She was still successful though.

After competing unsuccessfully in the 2005 Ethiopian national championships, she chose to quit school and move to Addis Ababa.  There, she joined the Ethiopian Bank club.  The club already had athletes competing in the 5000 and 10000 m, so they wanted her to compete in the 3000 m steeplechase.  Although she didn't like the event, she competed for the club at the 2006 Ethiopian championships in this event.  To her own surprise, she won the bronze.

Her success encouraged her, and she joined the club as one of their steeplechasers.

In 2007, she narrowly failed to qualify for the Ethiopian team for the World Championships.

In 2008, she finished 4th in the African Championships.  At the 2008 Olympics, a technical error at one of the jumps lead to her failing to qualify from the heats.

At the 2009 World Championships, she reached the final but finished in 13th place.  In the same year, she finished in 4th at the World Athletics Final.

She won silver at the 2010 African Athletics Championships, finishing 40 hundredths of a second behind the winner, Kenya's Milcah Chemos.

References

External links
 

1987 births
Living people
Ethiopian female long-distance runners
Ethiopian female steeplechase runners
Olympic athletes of Ethiopia
Athletes (track and field) at the 2008 Summer Olympics
Athletes (track and field) at the 2012 Summer Olympics
Athletes (track and field) at the 2016 Summer Olympics
Olympic silver medalists for Ethiopia
Medalists at the 2012 Summer Olympics
World Athletics Championships athletes for Ethiopia
World Athletics Championships medalists
Olympic silver medalists in athletics (track and field)
African Games gold medalists for Ethiopia
African Games medalists in athletics (track and field)
Athletes (track and field) at the 2015 African Games
21st-century Ethiopian women